Feel The Music is the fourth studio album by American funk band Dayton.

Track listing
Credits adapted from the album's original liner notes.

Notes 
a = Associate Producerc = Production Coordinator

Personnel
Leader
Music & Vocals arranged by Rahni Harris Jr.
Dayton
Rachel Beavers - Background Vocals
Rahni Harris Jr. - Lead Vocals (2, 4-7), Rhythm Guitar (3), Background Vocals, Vocoder, Steel Drums, Vibes, Wind Chimes, Hammond B3 Organ, Clavinet Keyboard, Fender Rhodes Piano, OBX, Prophet-5, Various Synthesizers
Karen Harris Chappell - Lead Vocals (8-9), Background Vocals
Kevin Hurt - Drums (1-7, 9), Other Percussion
Chris Jones - Lead Vocals (3), Background Vocals, Other Percussion
Shawn Sandridge - Lead Vocals (1), Lead Guitar (1-3, 6-9), Rhythm Guitar (1-2, 6-9), Background Vocals, Moog Synthesizer, OBX Synthesizer
Additional Musicians 
Billy Beck - Background Vocals
Wes Boatman - Prophet-5 Synthesizer
Bobby Glover - Background Vocals
Zachary Harris - Drums (8)
Larry Hatcher - Background Vocals
Terri Sandridge - Background Vocals
Doug Simon - Guitar (4)
Otha Stokes - Saxophone
Larry Troutman - Congas, Percussion (5)
Lester Troutman - Guest Drums (5)
Roger Troutman - Lead & Rhythm Guitars, Keyboards, Bass played by, Background Vocals (5)
Terry “Zapp” Troutman - Guest Bass Guitar (5)
Scott A. White III - Background Vocals
Doug Wimbish - Bass Guitar (1-4, 6-9)

References

1983 albums